Luke Greenbank (born 17 September 1997) is an English professional swimmer who specialises in backstroke. A medalist in the 200 metre backstroke at the Olympic Games and the World and European championships, he also swam the first leg in the 2019 World and 2020 European Championship gold medal-winning Great Britain medley relay teams. He won a silver medal as lead-off for Great Britain in the 4 x 100 metre medley relay for men at the 2020 Summer Olympics. He won a gold medal as lead-off for England in the heats of the 4 x 100 metre medley relay for men at the 2022 Commonwealth Games.

Greenbank has won gold medals as part of the 4 × 100 m Men's Medley Relay at the European, World Championships and Commonwealth Games. He won two gold medals in (200 m, 100 m backstroke) and breaking a new Junior World record in 200 m backstroke at the 2015 European Games, which doubled that year as the European Junior Swimming Championships. Greenbank has the unusual distinction of having won medals at the Commonwealth Games, European Championships, World Championships, European Games and Olympic Games, as well as a full set of junior medals (Youth Olympics, World Juniors and European Juniors).

Career
In 2014, at the 2014 European Junior Championships, Greenbank won gold medal in 200 m backstroke. He then competed at the 2014 Youth Olympics in Nanjing taking bronze in 200 m backstroke and gold in 4 × 100 m freestyle (with Duncan Scott, Miles Munro, Martyn Walton).

In June 2015, Greenbank competed at the inaugural 2015 European Games in Baku, He won 2 gold medals in (200 m, 100 m backstroke) and breaking a new Junior World record in 200 m backstroke at the 2015 European Games clocking in 1:56.89. He also took silver medals in 4 × 100 m medley (with Duncan Scott, Charlie Attwood, Charlie Attwood) and in 4 × 100 m mixed medley.

On August 25–30, Greenbank won bronze in men's 100 backstroke at the 2015 World Junior Championships held in Singapore.

2018–2019
At the 2018 Commonwealth Games held at the Gold Coast, Australia, Greenbank won a silver in the 4 × 100 m medley with Adam Peaty, James Guy and Ben Proud.

Greenbank won his first World Championships medal at the 2019 World Aquatics Championships held in Gwangju, South Korea. He finished third in the men's 200m backstroke, setting a personal best time. He was part of the team in the men's 4 × 100 metre medley relay together with Adam Peaty, James Guy and Duncan Scott. He started the race in the backstroke leg, and the team finished in a European record time of three minutes, 28.10 seconds to beat the United States, and won their first gold medal in the event in the World Championships.

Greenbank was one of the 2019 individual world championship medal-winners who were pre-selected for the postponed 2020 Tokyo Olympics.

2021–2022
At the 2020 European Championships held in Budapest in May 2021, Greenbank won a silver in 200 metre backstroke, as well as a gold in the men's 4 x 100 m medley relay with Peaty, Guy and Scott.

2022 World Championships
In June 2022, at the 2022 World Aquatics Championships, he won the silver medal in the 200 metre backstroke with a time of 1:55.16, finishing less than seven-tenths of a second behind gold medalist Ryan Murphy of the United States and less than two-tenths of a second ahead of bronze medalist Shaine Casas of the United States. He also won a bronze medal in the 4×100 metre medley relay, splitting a 53.81 to contribute to the final time of 3:31.31.

2022 Commonwealth Games
The first day of swimming competition at the 2022 Commonwealth Games, Greenbank qualified for the semifinals of the 100 metre backstroke, ranking fourth in the preliminaries with a time of 54.55 seconds. In the semifinals later in the day, he swam a 54.23 to qualify for the final ranking fifth. On day two, he placed fifth in the final with a time of 54.29 seconds, finishing 0.51 seconds behind gold medalist Pieter Coetze of South Africa. Three days later, he ranked as the overall fastest swimmer in the preliminaries of the 200 metre backstroke with a time of 1:56.33 and qualified for the final. He placed fifth in the final with a time of 1:56.98. On day six of six, he swam the backstroke leg of the 4×100 metre medley relay in 54.28 seconds in the preliminaries, helping qualify the relay to the final ranking second in 3:35.88. In the final, Brodie Williams substituted in for him and he won a gold medal for his efforts in the prelims when the finals relay placed first in 3:31.80.

2022 European Championships
A little over one week later, at the 2022 European Aquatics Championships held in Rome, Greenbank ranked fourth in the prelims heats of the 200 metre backstroke with a time of 1:57.81 and qualified for the evening semifinals. He swam a 1:57.07 in the semifinals, qualifying for the final ranking third. In the final, he won the bronze medal with a time of 1:56.15, finishing 0.53 seconds behind gold medalist Yohann Ndoye-Brouard of France. Five days later, on the final day of swimming competition, he helped placed fourth in the 4×100 metre medley relay, splitting a 54.28 for the backstroke leg of the relay to contribute to the final time of 3:33.60 and finishing 0.32 seconds behind the team from Austria that won the bronze medal.

References

External links
 
 
 
 
  
 Luke Greenbank at The-Sports.org

1997 births
Living people
Sportspeople from Crewe
English male swimmers
British male backstroke swimmers
Male medley swimmers
Swimmers at the 2015 European Games
European Games medalists in swimming
European Games gold medalists for Great Britain
European Games silver medalists for Great Britain
Swimmers at the 2014 Summer Youth Olympics
Swimmers at the 2020 Summer Olympics
Commonwealth Games medallists in swimming
Commonwealth Games gold medallists for England
Commonwealth Games silver medallists for England
Swimmers at the 2018 Commonwealth Games
Swimmers at the 2022 Commonwealth Games
World Aquatics Championships medalists in swimming
Youth Olympic gold medalists for Great Britain
European Aquatics Championships medalists in swimming
Medalists at the 2020 Summer Olympics
Olympic silver medallists for Great Britain
Olympic bronze medallists for Great Britain
Olympic silver medalists in swimming
Olympic bronze medalists in swimming
21st-century British people
Medallists at the 2018 Commonwealth Games
Medallists at the 2022 Commonwealth Games